The Liberal and Democratic Party of Mozambique is a liberal party in Mozambique.

See also
Liberalism
Contributions to liberal theory
Liberalism worldwide
List of liberal parties
Liberal democracy

Liberal parties in Africa
Political parties in Mozambique